Brovary Raion is a raion (district) in Kyiv Oblast of Ukraine. Its administrative center is the town of Brovary. Population: .

On 18 July 2020, as part of the administrative reform of Ukraine, the number of raions of Kyiv Oblast was reduced to seven, and the area of Brovary Raion was significantly expanded. Two abolished raions, Baryshivka and Zghurivka Raions, as well as the cities of Berezan and Brovary, which were previously incorporated as a city of oblast significance and did not belong to the raion, were merged into Brovary Raion. The January 2020 estimate of the raion population was

Subdivisions

Current
After the reform in July 2020, the raion consisted of 8 hromadas:
 Baryshivka settlement hromada with the administration in the urban-type settlement of Baryshivka, transferred from Baryshivka Raion;
 Berezan urban hromada with the administration in the city of Berezan, transferred from the city of oblast significance of Berezan;
 Brovary urban hromada, with the administration in the city of Brovary, transferred from the city of oblast significance of Brovary; 
 Kalynivka settlement htomada with the administration in the urban-type settlement of Kalynivka, retained from Brovary Raion;
 Kalyta settlement hromada with the administration in the urban-type settlement of Kalyta, retained from Brovary Raion;
 Velyka Dymerka settlement hromada with the administration in the urban-type settlement of Velyka Dymerka, retained from Brovary Raion;
 Zazymia rural hromada with the administration in the selo of Zazymia, retained from Brovary Raion;
 Zghurivka settlement hromada with the administration in the urban-type settlement of Zghurivka, transferred from Zghurivka Raion.

Before 2020

Before the 2020 reform, the raion consisted of four hromadas, 
 Kalynivka settlement hromada with the administration in Kalynivka;
 Kalyta settlement hromada with the administration in Kalyta;
 Velyka Dymerka settlement hromada with the administration in Velyka Dymerka;
 Zazymia rural hromada with the administration in Zazymia.

History
Starting on 1 March 2022, the area of a Brovary Raion became an arena of hostilities between the Ukrainian army and Russian occupation forces. Battles were fought on the territory of Baryshivka, Kalyta, and Velyka Dymerka hromadas. Residents of the surrounding villages were evacuated to Brovary. Three civilians were murdered by the Russian troops in the village of Bohdanivka of Brovary Raion.

References

 
Raions of Kyiv Oblast
Kyiv metropolitan area
1923 establishments in Ukraine